Alexander Grant Ruthven (April 1, 1882 – January 19, 1971) was a herpetologist, zoologist and the President of the University of Michigan from 1929 to 1951.

Biography

Alexander Grant Ruthven was born in 1882 in Hull, Iowa. He graduated from Morningside College in 1903. In 1906, he received a Ph.D. in zoology from the University of Michigan. He worked as a professor, director of the University Museum, and Dean. He became the President in 1929. As such, he promoted a corporate administrative structure. He also approved of police raids against bootleggers at fraternities. He retired in 1951, and died in 1971. He is buried at Forest Hill Cemetery which is adjacent to the university.

The work of Ruthven on the familiar garter snakes, published in 1908, may be regarded as founding an essentially new school of herpetology in the United States. This was a revision of a genus, carried out by the examination of large numbers of specimens, and evaluated largely in geographic terms.  Ruthven attracted many students of reptiles to the University of Michigan, his most brilliant pupils being Frank N. Blanchard and Helen T. Gaige. Ruthven described and named 16 new species of reptiles, including three with Gaige.

Legacy
Ruthven is commemorated in the scientific names of seven reptiles: Geophis ruthveni, Holbrookia maculata ruthveni, Lampropeltis ruthveni, Lepidoblepharis ruthveni, Macropholidus ruthveni, 
Masticophis schotti ruthveni, and Pituophis ruthveni.

Writings
Miscellaneous Papers on the Zoology of Michigan, W.H. Crawford Co., 1916
A Naturalist in a University Museum, 1931
Laboratory Directions in Principles of Animal Biology, by Aaron Franklin Shull, George Roger Larue, Alexander Grant Ruthven, McGraw-Hill Book Company, Inc, 1942
Naturalist in Two Worlds. Random Recollections of a University President, 1963
The Herpetology of Michigan
Description of a New Salamander from Iowa
Variations and Genetic Relationships of the Garter-Snakes
The Amphibians and Reptiles of the Sierra Nevada de Santa Marta, Columbia, etc. With map

References

Further reading
Alexander Grant Ruthven of Michigan: Biography of a University President, by Peter E. Van de Water, Grand Rapids, Michigan: Eerdmans Pub. Co, 1977

1882 births
1971 deaths
University of Michigan alumni
Presidents of the University of Michigan
Morningside University alumni
People from Hull, Iowa
American herpetologists
Burials in Michigan
20th-century American academics